Goodby is a surname. Notable people with the surname include:

 James Goodby (born 1929), American author and diplomat
 Jeff Goodby, American advertising executive
 John Goodby, British materials chemist

See also
 Goodbye, a parting phrase
 Goodbye (disambiguation)